Estudios Atacameños is a biannual peer-reviewed academic journal on anthropology, archaeology, and the history of South America. The journal is published by the Instituto de Arqueología y Antropología of the Catholic University of the North and the editor-in-chief is Alejandro Garcés (Catholic University of the North). The journal was established by Jesuit missionary Gustavo Le Paige.

Abstracting and indexing
Arts and Humanities Citation Index
Current Contents/Social And Behavioral Sciences
EBSCO databases
International Bibliography of Periodical Literature
International Bibliography of the Social Sciences
Scopus
Social Sciences Citation Index
According to the Journal Citation Reports, the journal has a 2020 impact factor of 0.581.

References

External links 
 

Anthropology journals
Archaeology journals
History of the Americas journals
Multilingual journals
Academic journals published by universities of Chile
Publications established in 1973
Biannual journals
Catholic University of the North